Sonnagh fort  is a ringfort (rath) and National Monument located in County Longford, Ireland.

Location

It stands in a commanding place overlooking the eastern plains extending to County Westmeath.

Description

The ringfort is a large bivallate enclosure with double bank and ditch. A spring lies immediately to the east.

History

There are seven ringforts surrounding Aughnacliffe, of which Sonnagh is the best preserved.   These forts are better thought of as protected homesteads rather than military structures. While house type varied, most were made of wood and were usually of post and wattle construction. The walls of the houses consisted of a double row of wattle spaced about 20 cm apart with a cavity filled with straw and bracken for insulation. The roof was thatched with straw and held up with wooden posts. The fort's walls gives their name to the townland: sonnach is Irish for "palisade."

References

Archaeological sites in County Longford
National Monuments in County Longford